Mahagaon is located in Pusad subdivision of Yavatmal district  in the state of Maharashtra, India.

It is located on the Maharashtra State Highway-3 MH MSH-3 and Maharashtra State Highways MH SH-183 connecting to Deulgaon Raja in Buldhana district and MH-232 connecting Kinwat town in Nanded district.

Mahagaon is a small and beautiful town known as COTTON TOWN and is  situated in Yavatmal District of Maharashtra.

Villages 
Village list under Mahagaon Taluka administration

History 
East India Company created Berar Province in 1853, Yavatmal became part of East Berar District in 1863 and later part of the South East Berar district, both districts of the Central Provinces and Berar. Mahagaon remained part of Madhya Pradesh until the 1956 reorganization of states when it was transferred to the Bombay State. With the creation of the Maharashtra state on 1 May 1960, Mahagaon along with Yavatmal district became a part of it.

Mahagaon is surrounded by hills from almost all the sides and is at little lower elevation than these hills. Pus river is lifeline of the town and also a source of drinking water and irrigation water.

The Mahagaon has population of 8248 of which 4169 are males while 4079 are females with total 1949 families residing as per Population Census 2011.

In Mahagaon village population of children with age 0-6 is 980 which makes up 11.88% of total population of village. Average Sex Ratio of Mahagaon village is 978 which is higher than Maharashtra state average of 929. Child Sex Ratio for the Mahagaon as per census is 929, higher than Maharashtra average of 894.

Mahagaon village has higher literacy rate compared to Maharashtra. In 2011, literacy rate of Mahagaon village was 85.54% compared to 82.34% of Maharashtra. In Mahagaon Male literacy stands at 91.31% while female literacy rate was 79.68%.

As per constitution of India and Panchyati Raaj Act, Mahagaon is administrated by Nagar Panchayat.

When we went into the history of town the credit of civilization goes to great personalities in town from Shree. Vishramji patil Narwade who was the Sarpanch of then village and one of the Initial developer of town, Shree Vasantraoji Naik former chief minister Maharashtra, Sudhakarraoji Naik former chief minister of Maharashtra and governor of Himachal Pradesh and many Others.

Mahagaon and surrounding areas mostly depend on agriculture as the main source of income. The land in the region is very well irrigated because of Pus dam, Veni Dam. Pus River also provide direct irrigation water to farms. Drinking water is also sourced from this canal.

Main crops include Sugarcane, Cotton, Soybean, Bengal gram, Jawar, and Wheat. There is a  market place for cotton and food grains in the city.

As main crops of Mahagaon are Cotton and Suger cane, there are two co-operative sugar factories viz. 1. Vasant Co-operative Sugar Factory, Vasant Nagar 2.  Pushpavanti Co-operative Sugar FacFactorSawana  and  Babasaheb Naik Cotton Mill at Pimpalgaon.

References

Cities and towns in Yavatmal district